Oak Park is a city in Emanuel County, Georgia, United States. In 1934 the town got national attention when it elected a municipal government that entirely consisted of women. The population was 484 at the 2010 census, up from 366 in 2000.

History
The town was originally named Sol, Georgia from June to August of 1880 then the town name was changed to Horace, Georgia. The town name was later changed to Oak Park, Georgia in 1904. 

In 1914 a murder–suicide committed by local farmer J.A. Eubanks got national news coverage. He murdered his wife and two daughters with an axe, set fire to some farm buildings, and shot himself in the head. Before killing himself, he woke a neighbor and told them what he had done. He did leave a suicide note. Several structures were destroyed in the fire, including houses of others. He had even cut the rope for the well bucket to keep the fire from being put out.

In a December 14, 1934 municipal election, Oak Park elected a mayor and five-person town council composed entirely of women. The election of an all-woman government was a first for Georgia, and novel enough that the event was covered by Associated Press and United Press news stories, both calling it "Petticoat Rule". It was not a surprise to the town however, as the all-woman slate had been nominated by men when the previous mayor retired and no men volunteered to replace him.

Some in the town apparently dissented, as the jail was set ablaze the night before the election and dynamite blasts were set off after it, damaging buildings. Despite that, Mrs. Solomon S. Youmans (the wife of a local physician) was elected mayor, and the council consisted of Mrs. J.D. Tyson, Mrs. G.C. Corbin, Mrs. J.J. Powell, Mrs. G.C. Williamson and Miss Ada Belle Thompson.

Geography

Oak Park is located in southern Emanuel County at  (32.370747, -82.309915), along U.S. Route 1. I-16 leads east  to Savannah and west  to Macon, while US 1 leads north  to Swainsboro, the Emanuel County seat, and south  to Lyons.

Demographics

2020 census

As of the 2020 United States census, there were 512 people, 238 households, and 166 families residing in the town.

2000 census
As of the census of 2000, there were 366 people, 148 households, and 103 families residing in the town. The racial makeup of the town was 90.98% White, 0.82% African American, 8.20% from other races. Hispanic or Latino of any race were 10.11% of the population.

There were 148 households, out of which 28.4% had children under the age of 18 living with them, 47.3% were married couples living together, 14.9% had a female householder with no husband present, and 30.4% were non-families. 27.0% of all households were made up of individuals, and 10.8% had someone living alone who was 65 years of age or older.  The average household size was 2.47 and the average family size was 2.90.

In the town the population was spread out, with 21.9% under the age of 18, 13.4% from 18 to 24, 27.6% from 25 to 44, 25.1% from 45 to 64, and 12.0% who were 65 years of age or older.  The median age was 36 years. For every 100 females, there were 110.3 males.  For every 100 females age 18 and over, there were 111.9 males.

The median income for a household in the town was $24,808, and the median income for a family was $33,333. Males had a median income of $30,625, versus $18,125 for females. The per capita income for the town was $14,317.  About 14.0% of families and 11.6% of the population were below the poverty line, including 11.8% of those under age 18 and 12.0% of those age 65 or over.

References

External links

Cities in Emanuel County, Georgia
Cities in Georgia (U.S. state)